The 1979 Railway Cup Hurling Championship was the 53rd staging of the Railway Cup since its establishment by the Gaelic Athletic Association in 1927. The cup began on 11 March 1979 and ended on 1 April 1979.

Munster were the defending champions, however, they were defeated by Connacht in the semi-final.

On 1 April 1979, Leinster won the cup following a 1-13 to 1-09 defeat of Connacht in the final. This was their 18th Railway Cup title overall and their first title since 1977.

Results

Semi-finals

Final

Scoring statistics

Top scorers overall

Bibliography

 Donegan, Des, The Complete Handbook of Gaelic Games (DBA Publications Limited, 2005).

References

Railway Cup Hurling Championship
Railway Cup Hurling Championship
Hurling